Tsvetomir Valeriev (born 16 August 1983) is a former Bulgarian footballer, who currently works as an assistant coach at Levski Sofia.

Career
Valeriev is a left-footed player and does not have any problems playing as a left-sided midfielder. He has good creative skills. In the winter of 2011 he went on trial with Kazakhstani club Caspiy, but eventually refused to sign because the club changed the salary figures.

References

1983 births
Living people
Bulgarian footballers
First Professional Football League (Bulgaria) players
Second Professional Football League (Bulgaria) players
Neftochimic Burgas players
PFC Lokomotiv Mezdra players
OFC Sliven 2000 players
FC Chernomorets Balchik players
FC Etar 1924 Veliko Tarnovo players
FC Botev Vratsa players
PFC Kaliakra Kavarna players
FC Tsarsko Selo Sofia players
Association football midfielders